Executive Action is a 1973 American conspiracy thriller film directed by David Miller about the assassination of United States President John F. Kennedy. Written by Dalton Trumbo, it was based on the novel of the same name by Mark Lane and Donald Freed. It stars Burt Lancaster and Robert Ryan. Miller had previously worked with Trumbo on his film Lonely Are the Brave (1962).

Plot
A narrator states that, when asked about the Kennedy Assassination and the Warren Commission report, United States President Lyndon B. Johnson said he doubted the Commission's findings. The narration ends by mentioning that the segment did not run on television, and was cut from a program about Johnson at his own request.

At a gathering in June 1963, shadowy industrial, political and US intelligence figures discuss their growing dissatisfaction with the Kennedy administration. In the plush home of lead conspirator Robert Foster, he and the others try to persuade Harold Ferguson, a powerful oil magnate dressed in white, to back their plans for Kennedy's assassination. Fellow conspirator James Farrington, a black-ops specialist, labels this as "executive action". He shows the group that magnicide is indeed a viable option. He refers to the Lincoln, Garfield, and McKinley assassinations as examples, as well as unsuccessful attempts including against Franklin Roosevelt in 1933. He explains these attempts were carried out by alleged lone fanatics; later scenes show the grooming process unwittingly undergone by Lee Harvey Oswald to fulfill precisely that role in the present conspiracy.

Ferguson remains unconvinced, saying such schemes are "only tolerable when necessary, and only permissible when they work". Obtaining his approval is crucial to the conspirators, although Farrington proceeds to organize two shooting teams in anticipation that Ferguson will change his mind. One of the teams is shown during practice in the Mojave Desert, shooting moving targets at medium-to-long range. One of the shooters says that he can only guarantee the operation's success if he fires at a target moving below 15 miles per hour.

After one of their meetings, Foster and Farrington discuss their murky, paranoid fears about the future of the country under Kennedy, and the security of ruling-class white people across the globe. They both seem privy to plans known to the CIA that Ferguson, a civilian, is perhaps unaware of. Foster forecasts the world population in 2000 at seven billion, most of them non-white and "[swarming] out of their breeding grounds into Europe and North America". He sees victory in Vietnam as an opportunity to control the developing world and reduce its population to 550 million, ominously adding "I know; I've seen the data". He also states that the same methods can then be applied to unwanted groups in the United States: Asians, blacks, Latinos, poor whites, etc. 
 
Ferguson  watches news reports and becomes highly concerned at Kennedy's increasingly liberal direction: action on civil rights, adoption of the Nuclear Test Ban Treaty, and nuclear disarmament. The decisive moment comes in an anti-Kennedy news report on the deteriorating situation in South Vietnam. It is followed by Kennedy's October 1963 decision (National Security Action Memorandum #263) to withdraw all US advisers from Vietnam by the end of 1965, effectively ending America's direct involvement in the Vietnam War. Ferguson calls Foster and tells him he now supports their project.

The scene of the shooting is described. As news of the assassination reaches the conspirators, the film surveys its effects. The shooters leave Dallas and the conspirators work to cover up the evidence. Farrington and his assistant Tim discuss the inconvenience of Oswald's survival. Tim approaches nightclub owner Jack Ruby, who stalks and kills Oswald. The plotters discuss the political fallout in Washington, D.C., concerned about retribution from Attorney General Robert F. Kennedy and the believability of the plot. Foster states that "Bobby Kennedy is not thinking as Attorney General but as a grieving brother. By the time he recovers it will be too late". The conspirators agree that people will believe in the story because "they want to". Soon after, Foster receives a call from Farrington's assistant: Farrington has died of a heart attack at Parkland Hospital. The conspirators are now insulated from the link to the group that committed the killings.

Their work is not quite finished. A photo collage of 18 material witnesses is shown, all but two of whom, the film states, died of unnatural causes within three years of the assassination. A voice-over says that an actuary of the British newspaper The Sunday Times calculated the probability that all these people who witnessed the assassination would die within that period of time to be 100,000-trillion-to-one.

Cast
 Burt Lancaster as James Farrington
 Robert Ryan as Robert Foster
 Will Geer as Harold Ferguson
 John Anderson as Halliday
 Ed Lauter as Operations Chief
 President John F. Kennedy Archival Footage

Production
The actor Donald Sutherland has been credited as having conceived of the film, and for hiring Lane and Freed to write the screenplay. Sutherland had planned to act in and produce Executive Action, but abandoned the project after failing to obtain financing, and took a role in another film. Executive Action was Robert Ryan's final film: he died of cancer four months before its release. Steve Jaffe, former DA Jim Garrison's investigator, was the film's technical consultant and supervising producer.

Music
The film's musical score was composed by Randy Edelman.

Reception
The film was generally panned. Pauline Kael called it a "feeble, insensitive fictionalization...It's a dodo-bird of a movie, the winner of the Tora! Tora! Tora! prize in miniature. With matchlessly dull performances." Leonard Maltin declared the film a "bomb" in his Movie Guide, calling it an "excruciatingly dull thriller [that] promised to clear the air about JFK's assassination but was more successful at clearing theaters."

In contrast, The New York Times gave it a positive review, its critic Nora Sayre writing that the film "offers a tactful, low-key blend of fact and invention. The film makers do not insist that they have solved John Kennedy's murder; instead, they simply evoke what might have happened...The film's sternest and strongest point is that only a crazed person acting on his own would have been acceptable to the American public — which, at that time, certainly did not want to believe in a conspiracy."

Meanwhile, Roger Ebert was equivocal, giving the film two stars and calling it "a dramatized rewrite of all those old assassination conspiracy books." Ebert stated "There’s something exploitative and unseemly in the way this movie takes the real blood and anguish and fits it neatly into a semi-documentary thriller." He added that "Executive Action doesn't seem much to want to entertain" and called Miller's direction "colorless". Ebert continued, saying that the film "borrows from actual newsreel footage of Kennedy, Oswald and Jack Ruby for most of its power. And it does have power, make no mistake. It has the power of evoking what will probably remain, for most of us, the most stunning public moment of our lives: the moment when we first learned that the President had been shot".

Home media
Executive Action was released on DVD on October 23, 2007 in the United States and Canada. It is now available for online viewing through 
Amazon.com Prime Video, Apple's iTunes store's downloadable application and online also through Vudu, Google Play and YouTube for both download and/or streaming video rentals.

See also
 List of American films of 1973

Notes

References

External links
 

1970s crime thriller films
1973 films
American political thriller films
Films about the assassination of John F. Kennedy
Films directed by David Miller
Films with screenplays by Dalton Trumbo
Films scored by Randy Edelman
Assassination of Abraham Lincoln
Cultural depictions of Abraham Lincoln
Assassination of William McKinley
Cultural depictions of William McKinley
Assassination of James A. Garfield
Cultural depictions of James A. Garfield
American neo-noir films
Films about conspiracy theories
1970s English-language films
1970s American films